The Lithuania Open is a darts tournament organized by the Lithuania Darts Federation that has been held since 2008.

List of tournaments

Men's

Women's

Tournament records

Men's

 Most wins 6:  Darius Labanauskas
 Most Finals 6:  Darius Labanauskas
 Most Semi Finals 6:  Darius Labanauskas
 Most Quarter Finals 6:  Darius Labanauskas
 Most Appearances 10:  Darius Labanauskas
 Most Prize Money won €1828.23: Darius Labanauskas
 Best winning average (103.74) :  Madars Razma v's  Darius Labanauskas, 2014, Semi Final
 Youngest Winner age 18:  Jimmy Hendriks
 Oldest Winner age 38: Darius Labanauskas

References 
Results

External links
Lithuania Darts Federation

2004 establishments in Lithuania
Darts tournaments
Sports competitions in Lithuania